The 76th Grey Cup was the 1988 Canadian Football League championship game that was played at Lansdowne Park in Ottawa, between the BC Lions and the Winnipeg Blue Bombers. The Blue Bombers defeated the favoured Lions 22–21. This was the first Grey Cup game between two teams from west of Ontario, and the first to be won by a team which had only a .500 season.

Game summary
Winnipeg Blue Bombers (22) - TDs, James Murphy; FGs, Trevor Kennerd (4); cons., Kennerd; singles, Trevor Kennerd, Bob Cameron (2).

BC Lions (21) - TDs, Anthony Cherry, David Williams; FGs, Lui Passaglia; cons., Passaglia (2); singles, Passaglia (2); safety touch.

The Lions jumped to a 7-1 lead in the opening quarter as running back Anthony Cherry scored on a 14-yard run. Kennerd kicked a 22-yard field goal to pull the Bombers within three.

With the wind at his back in the second quarter, Kennerd tied the score with a 43-yard field goal. But Lions quarterback Matt Dunigan connected with David Williams on a 26-yard scoring play, giving BC a 14-7 advantage.

The Bombers got that one back on their next possession. Quarterback Sean Salisbury threw a 35-yard touchdown strike to James Murphy to pull Winnipeg even. BC's Lui Passaglia failed on a 41-yard field goal attempt near the end of the half, but it did give the Lions a 15-14 lead at intermission.

Passaglia and Kennerd exchanged field goals in the third quarter. The game was deadlocked at 19 heading into the final 15 minutes.

With 2:55 remaining, Trevor Kennerd kicked a 30-yard field goal to put the Bombers in front for the first time in the game. With the score 22-19 in favour of the Bombers, the Lions marched 75 yards downfield to the Winnipeg seven-yard line. Dunigan's pass was batted down and intercepted in the end zone by Winnipeg's Mike Gray to snuff out the drive.

The BC defence held and Winnipeg head coach Mike Riley elected to give up a safety in favour of better field position, cutting the margin to just one. The ensuing kickoff was returned by BC's Anthony Drawhorn 38 yards to the BC 45-yard line, but the ball was brought back to the 30 when Cherry was flagged for an unnecessary roughness penalty. The Lions then went three and out and turned the ball over on downs and the Bombers ran out the clock for the win.

Trivia
The 50,604 in attendance was the largest crowd to witness a football game in Ottawa until the 2004 Grey Cup.

1988 CFL Playoffs

West Division
 Semi-final (November 13 @ Regina, Saskatchewan) BC Lions 42-18 Saskatchewan Roughriders
 Final (November 20 @ Edmonton, Alberta) BC Lions 37-19 Edmonton Eskimos

East Division
 Semi-final (November 13 @ Winnipeg, Manitoba) Winnipeg Blue Bombers 35-28 Hamilton Tiger-Cats
 Final (November 20 @ Toronto, Ontario) Winnipeg Blue Bombers 27-11 Toronto Argonauts

External links
 

Grey Cup
Grey Cup
Grey Cups hosted in Ottawa
1988 in Ontario
BC Lions
Winnipeg Blue Bombers
1980s in Ottawa
1988 in Canadian television
November 1988 sports events in Canada